The Journal of Extracellular Vesicles is a peer-reviewed open-access scientific journal covering research on lipid bilayer-delimited particles known as extracellular vesicles (EVs). EVs are released from cells and include endosome-origin exosomes and plasma membrane-derived ectosomes/microvesicles. The journal is helmed by editor-in-chief Jan Lötvall (University of Gothenburg) and is published by Wiley on behalf of the International Society for Extracellular Vesicles (ISEV). It was established in 2012. Until August 2019, the editors-in-chief were Clotilde Théry (Institut Curie), Yong Song Gho (Pohang University of Science and Technology), and Peter Quesenberry (Brown University). They were succeeded by Jan Lötvall (University of Gothenburg).

Scope
The journal considers research articles as well as review articles, short communications, technical notes, hypotheses, position papers, editorials, and letters to the editor. The journal has published the current consensus guidelines for the field, the Minimal Information for Studies of EVs (MISEV2018), building on minimal criteria published in 2014.

Notable articles
The journal has published numerous influential articles, some of which were summarized in an editorial in 2019 by the then-outgoing editors-in-chief.
The current consensus guidelines for the EV field, the Minimal Information for Studies of EVs, were prepared with input from almost 400 co-authors and co-coordinated by Clotilde Théry and Kenneth Witwer.
The precursor to MISEV2018 was published in 2014 as Lötvall, et al, by members of the ISEV Board of Directors.
A comprehensive review article on EVs was published in 2015 by María Yáñez-Mó, Pia Siljander, and colleagues.
The first position paper of ISEV was published in 2013, following a workshop on RNA and EVs that was held in New York City in October 2012.
A position paper on therapeutic applications of EVs was published in 2015.
Considerations for studies of RNA and EVs were recommended in 2017 following a Workshop in Utrecht, The Netherlands
During the COVID-19 pandemic, ISEV and the International Society for Gene and Cell Therapy released a statement on EV therapies for COVID-19.

History
The journal was established soon after the founding of ISEV, in April 2012, and was published by Co-Action Publishing for more than four years. Taylor & Francis acquired Co-Action in late 2016 and published the journal until October 2020. In September 2020, ISEV announced that Wiley would be the new publisher of the journal.

Abstracting and indexing
The journal is abstracted and indexed in:

According to the Journal Citation Reports, the journal has a 2020 impact factor of 25.841.

References

External links

Publications established in 2012
Biology journals
English-language journals
Wiley (publisher) academic journals